Clothes Make the Woman is a surviving 1928 American silent historical romantic drama film directed by Tom Terriss, and starring Eve Southern and Walter Pidgeon. The film is loosely based on the story of Anna Anderson, a Polish woman who claimed to be Grand Duchess Anastasia Nikolaevna of Russia, the daughter of the last czar of Russia Nicholas II and his wife Alexandra. Anastasia was killed along with her parents and siblings by communist Bolshevik revolutionaries on July 17, 1918.

Synopsis
Southern stars as Anastasia, a young Russian princess who is saved from execution by Victor Trent (Pidgeon), a Russian revolutionary. Victor risks his life to help Anastasia flee and the two part ways. Victor later makes his way to Hollywood unaware that Anastasia is also living in the city and attempting to become an actress. By this time, Victor is a popular film actor and producer. Victor sees Anastasia in a crowd of extras and recognizes her as the princess he had previously saved. He promptly casts her in a film about her life and casts himself as her leading man. During a scene reenacting the execution of her family, Victor accidentally shoots Anastasia but she soon recovers. The film ends with the marriage of Anastasia and Victor.

Cast
 Eve Southern as Princess Anastasia
 Walter Pidgeon as Victor Trent
 Charles Byer as The Director
 George E. Stone as Assistant Director
 Adolph Milar as Bolshevik Leader

Preservation status
Once thought to be a lost film. This title survives in the Cinematheque Royale de Belgique, Brussels and the BFI National Film and Television archive London.

See also
 Romanov impostors

References

External links

 
 

1928 films
Films directed by Tom Terriss
American independent films
American romantic drama films
American silent feature films
American black-and-white films
Films set in Los Angeles
Films set in Russia
Films set in the 1910s
Tiffany Pictures films
1920s historical romance films
Cultural depictions of Grand Duchess Anastasia Nikolaevna of Russia
American historical romance films
1928 romantic drama films
1920s American films
Silent romantic drama films
Silent American drama films
1920s English-language films
Silent historical romance films